Olga Vladimirovna Podchufarova (born 5 August 1992) is a retired Russian biathlete. She competed at the 2014 Winter Olympics in Sochi, where she placed 49th in the individual competition.

Results

Olympic Games

World Championships

Biathlon World Cup

World Cup Highlights
2015, Pokljuka,  3rd at mass start
2016, Antholz-Anterselva,  1st at sprint

References

External links
 

1992 births
Living people
Biathletes at the 2014 Winter Olympics
Russian female biathletes
Olympic biathletes of Russia
Biathlon World Championships medalists
Skiers from Moscow
State University of Management alumni